Kagaya is a Japanese family name:
 Ken Kagaya (politician) (1943–2014), Japanese Democratic Party politician
 Ken Kagaya (artist) (1944-2003), Japanese painter and writer
 Kagaya Yutaka (born 1968), Japanese digital artist
 Kagaya (Kabuki) - a traditional name of Kabuki actor's group (Yagō)

also used for:
 Kagaya (Ryokan) - a Ryokan (inn) in Wakura Onsen, Ishikawa Prefecture, Japan. 

Japanese-language surnames